This is a list of presidents of the Supreme Court of Justice of Austria. The President of the Supreme Court of Justice is the head of the Supreme Court of Justice.

List of Officeholders

Habsburg Monarchy 
 1848–1855: Ludwig Graf Taaffe
 1857–1865: Karl Ritter von Krauss
 1865–1891: Anton Ritter von Schmerling
 1891–1899: Karl Ritter von Stremayr
 1899–1904: Karl Habietinek
 1904–1907: Emil Steinbach
 1907–1918: Ignaz Freiherr von Ruber

First Republic 
 1919–1927: Julius Roller
 1927–1938: Franz Dinghofer

Second Republic 
 1945–1953: Guido Strobele-Wangendorf
 1954–1955: Franz Handler
 1956–1957: Karl Wahle
 1958–1965: Ludwig Viktor Heller
 1966–1968: Hans Kapfer
 1969–1971: Norbert Elsigan
 1972–1979: Franz Pallin
 1980: Wolfgang Lassmann
 1981–1982: Rudolf Hartmann
 1983–1986: Leopold Wurzinger
 1987–1993: Walter Melnizky
 1994–1998: Herbert Steininger
 1999–2002 Erwin Felzmann
 2003–2006: Johann Rzeszut
 2007–2011: Irmgard Griss
 seit 2012: Eckart Ratz

See also
 Austro-Hungarian Empire
 History of Austria
 Politics of Austria
 Constitutional Court (Austria)

External links
 The Supreme Court of Justice

References 

Presidents